The Chief of the General Staff of the Army and Armed Forces is the professional head of the Syrian Armed Forces and the Syrian Army. The Chief of the General Staff is appointed by the President of Syria, who is the commander-in-chief of the Armed Forces.

List of officeholders

References

Chiefs of Staff of the Syrian Army
Syria